Shubha Sathyendranath is marine scientist known for her work on marine optics and remote sensing of ocean color. She is the 2021 recipient of the  A.G. Huntsman Award for Excellence in the Marine Sciences.

Career
Sathyendranath's education took place in India and France. In 2003 she was lead scientist of Partnership for Observation of the Global Oceans. As of 2022 she is a scientist at Plymouth Marine Laboratory.

Research 
Sathyendranath's early research was on the development of algorithms define water masses based on their optical properties and how phytoplankton change the absorption of light in water. She then went on to use satellites to quantify primary production in seawater through work that was done in collaboration with Trevor Platt. This research led to global estimates of primary production. Her research also revealed that diatoms and growth rates of phytoplankton could be defined from satellite imagery.

Selected publications

Awards and honors 
In 2021, Sathyendranath received the A.G. Huntsman Award for Excellence in the Marine Sciences. In 2022 she received the Monaco's Knight of the Order of Cultural Merit.

References

External links 
 

Living people

Year of birth missing (living people)
Women oceanographers